Biograd or Biograd na Moru is a city in Zadar County, Croatia.

Biograd may also refer to:

Székesfehérvár, a city in Hungary also known in Croatian as Stolni Biograd
Biograd, Nevesinje, a village in Bosnia and Herzegovina